The , also referred to as The Japan Mountain Endurance Race　(日本山岳耐久レース), or Hasegawa Tsuneo Cup (長谷川恒男カップ), is an annual ultramarathon sporting event held since 1992 in the mountain area in Tokyo, Japan to commemorate a Japanese alpinist, Tsuneo Hasegawa　(長谷川恒男）. 

Men's course record is 7:19:13 achieved by Toru Higashi (東　徹) in 2013, and ladies' course record is 8:54:07 achieved by Norimi Sakurai  (櫻井教実) in 2008.

Results

2013
2,127 finishers out of 2,579 starters (2,852 entries). 
Men
 Toru Higashi (東　徹) 7:19:13 Course Record
 Tetsuya Osugi (大杉　哲也) 7:29:05
 Satoshi Okuyama (奥山　聡) 7:36:21

Ladies
 Yumiko Oishi (大石　由美子) 9:26:55
 Mitsuko Sato (佐藤　光子) 9:40:7
 Amy Sproston, 9:44:47

2012
1,984 finishers out of 2,344 starters (2,574 entries). 
Men
 Dakota Jones, 7:22:07
 Toshihito Kondo (近藤　敬仁), 7:40:18
 Kei Kikushima (菊嶋　啓), 7:53:48

Ladies
 Mitsuko Sato (佐藤　光子), 9:25:49
 Ryoko Eda (江田　良子), 9:32:30
 Yukari Nishida (西田　由香), 9:56:57

2011
1,725 finishers out of 2,158 starters (2,488 entries).
Men
 Tsuyoshi Soma (相馬　剛), 7:37:18
Ladies
 Yumiko Oishi (大石　由美子), 9:49:03

2010
1,622 finishers out of 2,232 starters (2,504 entries).
Men
 Ludwig Pommelet, 8:03:02
Ladies
 Yasuko Nomura (野村　泰子), 9:45:24

2009
1,727 finishers out of 2,070 starters (2,256 entries).
Men
 Yutaka Goto (後藤　豊), 7:31:48
Ladies
 Midori Hoshino (星野　緑), 10:10:22

References

External links
Hasetsune Cup Official Website
Experience at Hasetsune Cup by Dakota Jones

Ultramarathons
Marathons in Japan